A list of populated places in the Shetland Islands:

A

Aith
Aithsetter
Assater
Aywick

B

Baltasound
Basta
Belmont
Biggings
Bigton
Billister
Bixter
Boddam
Bousta
Brae
Braehoulland
Braewick
Breiwick
Bremirehoull
Brettabister
Bridge End
Bridge of Walls
Brindister
Brough, Bressay
Brough, South Nesting
Brough, Whalsay
Browland
Burrafirth
Burrastow
Burravoe

C

Catfirth
Challister 
Channerwick
Clate
Clivocast
Clousta
Copister
Cready Knowe
Cullivoe
Cunningsburgh
Cutts

D

Duncansclett

E

East Burrafirth
Effirth
Esha Ness
Exnaboe

F

Firth
Fladdabister
Freester
Fetlar

G

Garth, South Nesting
Girlsta
Gletness
Gloup
Gluss
Gonfirth
Gossabrough
Gruting
Grutness
Gulberwick
Gunnista
Gutcher

H

Ham, Bressay
Hamister
Hamnavoe
Haroldswick
Heogan
Heylor
Hillock
Hillswick
Hoswick
Housay
Huxter

I

Ireland
Isbister, Northmavine
Isbister, Shetland

K

Kirkabister, Bressay

L

Laxo
Leebitton
Lerwick
Levenwick
Livister
Lunna
Lunning

M

Mail
Marrister
Maywick
Melby
Mid Yell
Mossbank
Muckle Roe

N

Neap
Nesbister
Netherton
New Park
Nibon
Noonsbrough
North Park
North Roe
Norwick

O

Ocraquoy
Ollaberry
Otterswick

P

Papil

Q

Quarff
Quendale

R

Reawick
Rerwick

S

Saltness
Sandgarth
Sandness
Sandwick, Dunrossness, Mainland
Sandwick, Whalsay
Sanick
Scalloway
Scatness
Scousburgh
Sellafirth
Silwick
Skaw, Whalsay
Skaw, Unst
Skeld
Skellister
Skerries
Sodom
Sound, Lerwick
Sound, Weisdale
South Scousburgh
South Whiteness
Stenness
Sumburgh
Swining
Symbister

T

Tangwick
Tingwall
Toab
Toft
Tresta, Bixter
Tresta, Fetlar
Tripwell
Turniebrae
Twatt

U

Ulsta
Urafirth
Uyeasound, Aithsting
Uyeasound

V

Vaila
Vaivoe
Vats-houll
Vassa
Vatsetter
Veensgarth
Vidlin
Voe, in Delting
Voe, in Northmavine
Voxter

W

Wadbister, Girlsta
Walls
Weisdale
West Burrafirth
West Sandwick
Westerfield
Westerwick
Westing
Whiteness
Wormadale

Former settlements

Aith, Bressay
Brew Settlement
Cullingsburgh
Garth, Dunrossness
Grimsetter
Gunnister
Hoversta, Bressay
Kebister
Treawick
Wadbister, Bressay

 
Shetland
Populated places in Scotland